The  was a human crush that occurred on 21 July 2001 in Akashi, Hyōgo, Japan. In the incident, a large crowd of people packed into a partially enclosed pedestrian overpass leading to Asagiri Station after a fireworks show. The resulting crush killed 11 people, including two adults and nine children, and injured 183 others. Five civic and security officials were later convicted of professional negligence for not preventing the disaster.

References

Human stampedes in 2001
Man-made disasters in Japan
2001 disasters in Japan
Akashi, Hyōgo
Crowd collapses and crushes